The 2010–11 Cypriot Second Division was the 56th season of the Cypriot second-level football league. Aris Limassol won their 4th title.

Team Changes from 2009–10

Teams promoted to 2010–11 Cypriot First Division
 Alki Larnaca
 AEK Larnaca
 Olympiakos Nicosia

Teams relegated from 2009–10 Cypriot First Division
 Aris Limassol
 Nea Salamina
 APEP

Teams promoted from 2009–10 Cypriot Third Division
 Champions: Chalkanoras Idaliou
 Runners-up: Adonis Idalion, Anagennisi Deryneia

Teams relegated to 2010–11 Cypriot Third Division
 Frenaros FC
 Ayia Napa
 MEAP Nisou

League table

Promotion group

Results

Top scorers

Including matches after 26th matchday; Source:

See also
 2010–11 Cypriot First Division
 2010–11 Cypriot Cup

Notes

Sources

Cypriot Second Division seasons
2010–11 in Cypriot football
Cyprus